Bernard Malherbe (born 17 January 1945) is a French boxer. He competed in the men's light heavyweight event at the 1968 Summer Olympics.

References

1945 births
Living people
French male boxers
Olympic boxers of France
Boxers at the 1968 Summer Olympics
People from Herblay
Sportspeople from Val-d'Oise
Light-heavyweight boxers